OSAM-1 (On-orbit Servicing, Assembly, and Manufacturing 1) is a US NASA spacecraft designed to test on-orbit refilling of satellites. It was previously known as Restore-L.

Originally planned for 2020, its launch is currently planned for no earlier than 2025.  Its first objective would be the complex refueling of Landsat 7, an existing satellite launched in 1999. It would involve grasping the satellite with a mechanical arm, gaining access to the satellite's fuel tank by cutting through insulation and wires and unscrewing a bolt, and then attaching a hose to pump in hydrazine fuel. This would be the first refueling of a satellite in space, and a demonstration of the potential to repair the thousands of satellites in orbit and keep them in operation. Because the satellites now in space were not designed to be serviced, there are significant challenges to doing so successfully.

OSAM-1's second objective would be to deploy a separate robot called SPIDER (Space Infrastructure Dexterous Robot) to  build a new structure in space. Using robots to build and assemble new structural components from scratch would be an important step towards a type of space-based construction that has been impossible to date.

Description 
The OSAM-1 spacecraft will include :
 two arms to grapple the target satellite
 the attached payload for SPIDER

History 
In 2016, NASA's Restore-L satellite was intended to refuel Landsat 7.
In 2020 SPIDER was added and the name was changed from Restore-L to OSAM-1.

Progression 

A subsequent mission, OSAM-2 will also have two robotic arms. OSAM-2 will use ModuLink software which is based on xLink.

See also 
 
 In-orbit refueling

References 

Future spaceflights
NASA spacecraft